A Dream Deferred may refer to:

 Montage of a Dream Deferred, a book-length poem suite published by Langston Hughes in 1951
 A Dream Deferred (album), a 2012 album by Brooklyn rapper Skyzoo
"Harlem", a poem by Langston Hughes also known as "A Dream Deferred"